From Then Till Now is an album released by "The Big 3", a Chubby Jackson-led group, in 1960 on Everest LPBR-1041 (mono) and SDBR-1041 (stereo).

Track listing 
 "At the Jazz Band Ball"
 "Struttin' With Some Bar-B-Que"
 "Bill Bailey, Won't You Please Come Home"
 "Till There Was You"
 "Undecided"
 "Don't Be That Way"
 "Now's the Time"
 "Bernie's Tune"
 "Robbin's Nest"
 "Flyin' Home"

Personnel
 Chubby Jackson - bass
 Marty Napoleon - piano
 Mickey Sheen - drums

References

1960 albums
Chubby Jackson albums
Everest Records albums